T. elegans may refer to:
 Tenuipalpus elegans, a mite species
 Thalasseus elegans, the elegant tern, a seabird species found on the Pacific coasts of the southern United States and Mexico and winters south to Peru, Ecuador and Chile
 Theocolax elegans, a parasitoid wasp species
 Tibouchina elegans, an ornamental plant species native to Brazil
 Tritoniopsis elegans, synonym: Tritonia elegans, a marine dendronotid nudibranch species
 Tutelina elegans, a jumping spider
 Tynanthus elegans, a flowering plant species
 Typhlops elegans, a snake species found on the island of Príncipe, São Tomé and Príncipe

Synonyms 
 Thyca elegans, a synonym for Capulus elegans, a sea snail species
 Trimeresurus elegans, a synonym for Protobothrops elegans, a venomous pitviper species found in Japan